Holy Trinity Church is a Church of England parish church in the town of Huddersfield, West Yorkshire, England. It opened in 1819 and is a grade II* listed building. The church is situated just off Trinity Street, named after the church and forming part of the main A640 road from Huddersfield to Rochdale, and is just outside the town centre, in the suburb of Marsh. The parish forms part of the diocese of Leeds.

History

In the early 19th century the town of Huddersfield was growing rapidly as a result of the industrial revolution and the town's parish church was too small to cope. In order to address this, Holy Trinity was built between 1816 and 1819 as a chapel of ease, and consecrated in 1820. The new church was funded by Benjamin Haigh Allen, a local banker, and designed by the architect Thomas Taylor of Leeds.

Benjamin Haigh Allen invited Henry Maddock (1781-1826) to be Holy Trinity's first Perpetual Curate.  Maddock met Allen during a preaching tour he gave in 1814 along with the Revd. Legh Richmond, on behalf of the Church Mission Society.

Holy Trinity became a parish church in its own right in 1857, serving Marsh and the adjoining suburbs of Edgerton and Springwood.

See also
Listed buildings in Huddersfield (Newsome Ward - outer areas)

References

Bibliography

External links

 

Holy Trinity Church
Grade II* listed churches in West Yorkshire
Church of England church buildings in West Yorkshire
Churches completed in 1819
19th-century Church of England church buildings
Anglican Diocese of Leeds